Natalya Meshcheryakova; born 1 June 1972, is a former freestyle swimmer from Russia.

She competed at the 1992 Summer Olympic Games & the 1996 Summer Olympic Games, finishing sixth in the final of the 50 metres freestyle in a time of 25.47 seconds in 1992. Meshcheryakova competed for the Unified team in 1992, & for Russia in 1996.

Her best result at the Olympics was a bronze medal in 1992 whilst swimming the anchor leg for the Unified teams 4 x 100 metre medley relay.

References

Russian female freestyle swimmers
Soviet female freestyle swimmers
Olympic swimmers of the Unified Team
Olympic swimmers of Russia
Swimmers at the 1992 Summer Olympics
Swimmers at the 1996 Summer Olympics
Olympic bronze medalists for the Unified Team
Living people
Olympic bronze medalists in swimming
World Aquatics Championships medalists in swimming
European Aquatics Championships medalists in swimming
Year of birth missing (living people)
Medalists at the 1992 Summer Olympics